The AEG G.I (originally designated as the K.I) was a three-seat, twin-engined German biplane bomber aircraft of World War I. It was tested and found to be viable for air-fighting in the latter half of 1915 but performed poorly, necessitating the development of the AEG G.II.

Specifications (AEG G.I)

See also

References

Notes

Bibliography
Gray, Peter and Thetford, Owen. German Aircraft of the First World War. London:Putnam, 1970 2nd. Ed..

G.I
1910s German bomber aircraft
Biplanes
Aircraft first flown in 1915
Twin piston-engined tractor aircraft